This is a list of high schools in the U.S. state of Oregon. Schools are listed in alphabetical order by city, then in alphabetical order by school name. Schools that have closed are listed separately.

Current schools

Public Schools

Private Schools

Defunct

See also
 List of school districts in Oregon
 Lists of Oregon-related topics

References

References
 
 OSAA member schools

Oregon
High schools